Lauro "Larry" Zarate Alcala (August 18, 1926 – June 24, 2002) was a well-known editorial cartoonist and illustrator in the Philippines. In 2018, he was posthumously conferred the National Artist for Visual Arts title and the Grand Collar of the Order of National Artists (Order ng Pambansang Alagad ng Sining).

Biography
He was born on August 18, 1926, to Ernesto Alcala and Elpidia Zarate in Daraga, Albay. Through a scholarship from Manila Times granted by the publisher Ramón Roces, he obtained a degree of Bachelor of Fine Arts in Painting at the University of the Philippines (UP) in 1950. He became a professor at the same university from 1951 to 1981. He also received the Australian Cultural Award accompanied by a travel study grant in 1975.

He started his cartooning career in 1946 while still attending school. After World War II, he created his very first comic strip, Islaw Palitaw, which was printed on the pages of the Filipino weekly magazine Liwayway. In 1947, he created the comic strip Kalabog en Bosyo, using Taglish as the medium of communication of his characters.
He pioneered animated cartoons for television commercials of products such as Darigold Milk in 1957 and Caltex in 1965. His campaign for the advancement of illustration and commercial art in the Philippines resulted to the establishment of the Visual Communication Department at the UP College of Fine Arts.

In 1997, the Philippine Board on Books for Young People (PBBY) granted him the title Dean of Filipino Cartoonists, an achievement award for his lifetime dedication to the art of capturing humor in the character and everyday life in the Philippines. In 1991, he promoted the formation of a group of young children's book illustrators called Ang Ilustrador ng Kabataan (Ang INK).

All in all, he made over 500 cartoon characters, twenty comic strips, six movies, two murals, and 15,000 published pages in his 56 years of professional cartooning career. He believed in the far-reaching role of cartoons in education and value formation.

Death
He died on June 24, 2002, when he was 75.

His Cartoons

His most popular cartoon series was Slice of Life, which is a reflection of the many unique aspects of everyday life in the Philippines. He captured the interest of his weekend patrons by giving them the task of looking for his image cleverly concealed within the weekend cartoon. He did the same with his other comic strip Kalabog en Bosyo. His cartoons had been tapped in advertising campaigns, such as corporate calendars, print ads, promotional T-shirts and in San Miguel Beer cans.

In 1988, his Slice of Life received the Best in Humor award and was also cited for helping to keep alive the Filipino's ability to laugh at himself, through the lively marriage of art and humor, and through commentaries that are at once critical and compassionate, evoking laughter and reflection.

Slice of Life appeared on the pages of the Weekend Magazine.

Mang Ambo
Mang Ambo is the personification of the Filipino according to Larry Alcala. Mang Ambo, the character, is an incorrigible cock-eyed innocent, possessing a small town charm amidst urban sophistication. Through Mang Ambo and the other characters of a fictional place called Barrio Bulabog, Alcala exposed the follies and foibles of Philippine society in general and of cosmopolitan life in particular. In this cartoon strip's characters, he also affirmed the Filipino's peculiar coping mechanism of laughing at himself in the face of adversity but still absorbing life's vicissitudes with resilience. Mang Ambo made its debut in 1960 as a full-page feature in the Weekly Graphic. The cartoon series later became the first Alcala comic strip to be compiled in book form.

Kalabog en Bosyo
Alcala's most enduring comic strip was Kalabog en Bosyo that first appeared on the pages of Pilipino Komiks in 1947. It eventually became the longest running cartoon series created by a Filipino.

Decades before Slice of Life, Alcala was already doing cameo roles in his Kalabog en Bosyo comic strips, but instead of portraying himself with a moustach, spectacles and side burns, he rendered himself in a crew-cut, younger and about 100-pounds thinner profile.

An onomatopoeic Tagalog word, the name of the character, Kalabog, refers to the thud sound produced after the impact of a falling object finally reaching solid ground. In Kalabog en Bosyo, Alcala pioneered in the blending of Tagalog and English or Taglish as the medium of communication among his characters. The comic misadventures of the two bungling detectives namely Kalabog and Bosyo had been transposed into films by Sampaguita Pictures in 1957, starring the Filipino actors-comedians, Dolphy and Panchito Alba.

Summary of published works
The following is a summary of Alcala's published works:
International Cartoons, Athens, Greece (1980)
Salon of Cartoons, Montreal, Canada (1980)
Laugh and Live, Life Today (1981–2002)
Slice of Life, Weekend (1980–1986), Sunday Tribune (1986–1987), Sunday Times (1987–1995), Philstar (1995–2002)
Bing Bam Bung, Pilipino Funny Komiks (1978–1989)
Asiong Aksaya, Daily Express, Tagalog Klasiks (1976–1984)
Mod-Caps, Mod Magazine (1974–2002)
Snickerteens, TSS Magazine (1973–1984)
Smolbateribols, Darna Komiks (1972–1984)
Siopawman, Daily Express (1972–1983, 2002)
Kalambogesyons, Pinoy Komiks (1966–1972)
Congressman Kalog, Aliwan Komiks (1966–1972)
Barrio Pogspak, Holiday Komiks (1966–1972)
Project 13, Pioneer Komiks (1966–1972)
Loverboy, Redondo Komiks (1964–1969)
Cartoon Feature, Asia Magazine (1963)
Mang Ambo, Weekly Graphic (1963–1965), Weekly Nation (1965–1972) Manila Standard (1993–1998)
This Business of Living, Weekly Graphic (1951–1965), Weekly Nation (1965–1972)
Best Cartoons from Abroad, New York, USA (1955–1956)
Tipin, Hiwaga Komiks (1951–1965)
Kalabog en Bosyo, Pilipino Komiks (1949–1983), Manila Times (1984–1995)
Islaw Palitaw (1946–1948)
A Cover for Asiaweek Magazine, February 10, 1984
Bing Bam Bung, Pilipino Funny Komiks
A Cartoon Mural for the Philippine Village Hotel 
A Mural for the Philippine Commission on Audit
Contributions for Duty Free 
Contributions for Jollibee restaurant
Caricatures and Cartoons, Private collections
Cover designs, brochures and catalogs, University of the Philippines
San Miguel Corporation Calendar, 1983
SPIC Cartoonists Exhibit on Wheels, 1967 Society of Philippine Illustrators and Cartoonists (SPIC)
Asiong Aksaya TV show, Energy Conservation Movement of the Philippines, 1977

Contributions to Philippine education
The following are Alcala's contributions to education in the Philippines:
Introduced the first college degree course on Commercial Design in the Philippines, 1953
Introduced the first 8 mm film production of animated cartoons in Visual Communications course, 1972
Chairman Department of Visual Communications, University of the Philippines, 1978–1981
Professor, College of Fine Arts, University of the Philippines, 1976–1979
Associate Professor, College of Fine Arts, University of the Philippines, 1971–1976
Assistant Professor, College of Fine Arts, University of the Philippines, 1962–1970
Instructor, College of Fine Arts, University of the Philippines, 1951–1962

Cartoon exhibitions
The following are exhibitions of Alcala's cartoons:
1999 Larry Alcala & Friends: Cartoons and Caricatures Show, The Westin Philippine Plaza (now Sofitel Philippine Plaza), CCP Complex, Roxas Boulevard, 
1998 Larry Alcala, Life and Times of a Cartoonist, Museo Pambata Foundation, Inc.
1998 Cartoon Festival, Seoul, Korea
1995 Asian Cartoonist Exhibition and Symposium, Japan 
1995 Slices of Larry's Art, SM Megamall Art Center & Liongoren Art Gallery
1993 Cartoons, Solo exhibit, San Jose & San Francisco, California, U.S.A.
1991 Cartoons, Group exhibit, Japan
1990 ASEAN Cartoonist Exhibit, Tokyo, Japan
1989 Cartoon Exhibit, China
1988 Slices of Life Part 2, Art Association of Bacolod Gallery
1987 Slices of Life Here and Abroad, Hyatt Regency Manila
1987 Cartoons, Group exhibit, Hiroshima, Japan
1986 Cartoons, Solo exhibit, Bratislava, Czechoslovakia
1985 Cartoons, Group exhibit, Chicago, San Francisco & Los Angeles, U.S.A.
1984 1st Asian Cartoonist Conference, Hiroshima, Japan 
1984 Larry Alcala's First One-Man Exhibition, Heritage Art Center
1982 SKP Exhibit in Australia

Professional and journalistic achievements
The following is an enumeration of Alcala's professional and journalistic accomplishments:
Art Director, Weekly Nation, 1965–1972
Editorial Cartoonist and Illustrator, Weekly Graphic, 1961–1964
TV Art Consultant, Citizens Award for Television (CCMM) 1971–1972
TV Animated Cartoon Commercial for Darigold Milk, 1969
Art Consultant, U.P. Public Affairs TV, Channel 13, 1963–1964
Design artist, Mobil Philippines, 1961–1962
Supervising Animator, Universal Animated Productions, 1959–1960
Movie Consultant, Kalabog and Bosyo, 1986
Movie Consultant, Asiong Aksaya, GP Productions, 1977
Movie Consultant, Kalabog and Bosyo, Sampaguita Pictures, 1957
Movie Consultant, Tipin, Sampaguita Pictures, 1956
Scriptwriter, Dos por Dos, Channel 2, 1974
Advertising Artist, Pan Pacific Advertising, 1948–1949

Clubs and organizations
Alcala had been affiliated with the following clubs and organizations:
Adviser, Samahang Kartunista ng Pilipinas (SKP), 1989–2002
President, Samahang Kartunista ng Pilipinas (SKP), 1979– 1989
President, Art Directors Club of the Philippines, 1963–1964
Vice President, Society of Philippine Illustrators and Cartoonists (SPIC) 1962–1963

Awards, citations and recognitions
He received recognition from the following entities:
U.P. College of Fine Arts
The Board of Directors of the U.P. Alumni Association, 
The Office of the Mayor of the City of Manila, Philippines
The Philippine Board on Books for Young People (PBBY)
The Archdiocese of Manila Catholic Press Awards
The Citizens' Council for Mass Media 1970 CAM Awards 
The Komiks Operation Brotherhood, Inc. (Komopeb) (Life Achievement Award)
Samahan ng mga Manunulat, Artist, at Patnugot at mga Manggagawa sa Komiks
SPIC-NPC Annual Art Awards
The Society of Philippine Illustrators and Cartoonists
The Society of Philippine Illustrators and Cartoonists (3rd SPIC Annual Art Awards)
The Galleria Bernice L
The U.P. College of Fine Arts Alumni Foundation, Inc.
The University of the Philippines Alumni Association
The Philippine Council of Industrial Editors
The United Artists and Core Corporation, the Philippine Tuberculosis Society, Inc.
Operation Smile
The Bureau of Land Transportation
The Safety Organization of the Philippines, Inc.
The Veterans Memorial Medical Center Diabetes Association
The University of St. La Salle, Bacolod City
The Positive Artists Group (Pamana award)
The U.P. College of Fine Arts
The University of the Philippines (Service Award, 25 years of service)
Caltex and D.O.S.T
Philips -Boy Scouts of the Philippines, Parol Festïval 1986
The National Manpower and Youth Council Office of Vocational Preparation
The Department of Laboratories Veterans Memorial Medical Center
NAFC, DECS, DENR, DA
The Gawad CCP Para sa Telebisyon sa Taong 1988
St. Patrick Commercial Appreciation Award
The National Environmental Protection Council Awards
The City of Bacolod
Caltex-DECS-DOST Science Art Contest

References

External links
Larry Alcala, Sr. by Lauro Alcala, Jr.
Larry Alcala: Illustrator, Storyteller by May M. Tobias
Slice of Life
Mang Ambo
Kalabog en Bosyo

1926 births
2002 deaths
Bicolano people
Comic strip cartoonists
Filipino cartoonists
Filipino illustrators
National Artists of the Philippines
People from Albay
University of the Philippines alumni